Janjanbureh or Jangjangbureh is a town, founded in 1832, on Janjanbureh Island, also known as MacCarthy Island, in the Gambia River in eastern Gambia.  Until 1995, it was known as Georgetown and was the second largest town in the country.  It is the capital of Janjanbureh Local Government Area (formerly the Central River Division), and the Janjanbureh district. The population of the Janjanbureh LGA was 127,333 at the 2013 population census.

The town is best known as home to Gambia's main prison.  The Wassu stone circles lie 22 km northwest of Lamin Koto, on the north bank across from Janjanbureh.

It was the birthplace of the late Yale University historian Lamin Sanneh.

The island is known locally as MacCarthy Island and is located in what used to be called MacCarthy Island Division.  The island is accessed by bridge from the south bank, and small boat ferries or government ferry on the north bank. In 1995, both the city of Georgetown and MacCarthy Island were renamed Janjanbureh respectively.

Gallery

References

External links
Information from "Slavery Trade of the Gambia"

 
Central River Division
Populated places established in 1832
Populated places in the Gambia
Gambia River
1832 establishments in Africa
Local Government Areas of the Gambia